The 1979 Avon Championships were the eighth WTA Tour Championships, the annual tennis tournament for the best female tennis players in singles on the 1979 WTA Tour. It was held on indoor carpet courts from March 21 through March 25, 1979, in Madison Square Garden in New York City, United States.

First-seeded Martina Navratilova won the singles title and earned $100,000 first-prize money.

Finals

Singles
 Martina Navratilova defeated  Tracy Austin, 6–3, 3–6, 6–2.

Doubles
 Françoise Dürr /  Betty Stöve defeated  Sue Barker /  Ann Kiyomura, 7–6(7–1), 7–6(7–3).

See also
 1979 Colgate Series Championships

References

External links
 
 ITF tournament edition details
  WTA tournament edition details

WTA Tour Championships
Avon Championships
Avon Championships
Avon Championships
1970s in Manhattan
Avon Championships
Madison Square Garden
Sports competitions in New York City
Sports in Manhattan
Tennis tournaments in New York City